Sympathy Seeker is a 1997 Russian romantic comedy film directed by Vladimir Mashkov.

Plot 
The film tells about a young teacher Nastya, who after the death of her mother decides to publish her unsent letter to an unknown Pavel. And suddenly three Pavels appear in the village at the same time...

Cast 
 Yelena Shevchenko as Nastya
 Nikolay Fomenko as Kolya
 Valentin Gaft as Magician
 Lev Durov as Cosmonaut
 Oleg Tabakov as Cook
 Mikhail Filipchuk as Demendeyev (as Misha Filipchuk)
 Viktor Pavlov
 Fyodor Valikov as Watchman
 Lyudmila Davydova as Saleswoman
 Tatyana Rogozina as Attendant
 Vladimir Mashkov as Fyodor

References

External links 
 

1997 films
1990s Russian-language films
Russian romantic comedy films
1997 romantic comedy films